Coca-Cola Freestyle is a touch screen soda fountain introduced by The Coca-Cola Company in 2009. The machine features 165 different Coca-Cola drink products, as well as custom flavors. The machine allows users to select from mixtures of flavors of Coca-Cola branded products which are then individually dispensed. The machines are currently located in major Coca-Cola partners and retail locations as a part of a gradual and ongoing deployment.

In 2014, Pepsi launched a competing, similar machine, the Pepsi Spire.

Design 

The cabinetry was designed by the Italian automotive design firm Pininfarina, via their Pininfarina Extra industrial and product design subsidiary. The Freestyle’s beverage dispensing technology was designed by Dean Kamen, the inventor of the Segway, in return for Coca-Cola distributing his Slingshot water purification system.

The technologies involved include microdispensing technology and proprietary PurePour technology. Both technologies were originally developed to deliver precise doses of drugs. One Freestyle unit with a similar footprint to a current vending machine can dispense 126 kinds of carbonated and non-carbonated beverages. Microdosing blends one or more concentrated ingredients in  packets with water and sweetener at the point where the beverage is dispensed, thus avoiding the use of traditional  boxes of syrup (also known as a bag-in-a-box). Cartridges store concentrated ingredients in the dispenser cabinet and are RFID enabled. The machine uses RFID chips to detect its supplies and to radio resupplying needs to other units.

History 
Testing began in Utah, Southern California, and Georgia in July 2009 with 60+ locations around America planned by the end of that summer. Test locations around Coca-Cola's home city of Atlanta included the World of Coca-Cola, AMC Theatres Southlake Pavilion 24 and Parkway Point 15, and area food chains, including Willy's Mexicana Grill. Three machines are available in the Universal Studios Florida and Universal's Islands of Adventure theme parks as well as the AMC movie theater at Disney Springs shopping complex in Lake Buena Vista, Florida and the World Waterpark in West Edmonton Mall in Edmonton, Alberta and Wild Adventures in Valdosta, Georgia.

Coca-Cola deployed the machines to 500 more locations in the United States in June 2010, followed by deployment to some universities in the United States. Deployment has continued in select locations of restaurant chains such as Wing Stop, Wawa, Così,   Taco Time Northwest, Togo's, Roy Rogers, Davanni's, PDQ Dairy Queen, Fuddruckers, Five Guys, Kelly's Roast Beef, CG Burgers, Firehouse Subs, Pei Wei Asian Diner, Wendy's, Jack in the Box, Carl's Jr./Hardee's, Beef O'Brady's, Hess Express, Subway, White Castle, Boloco, Salsarita's, McDonald's, Moe's Southwest Grill, BurgerFi, and Zaxby's. Select Wegmans locations also have Coca-Cola Freestyle machines. Burger King announced in December 2011 that it plans to implement the Freestyle system in its 850 company-owned restaurants in the U.S. by early-to-mid 2012, and was encouraging its franchisees to follow suit.

Coca-Cola has installed Freestyle machines in Toronto in select Wendy's, Burger King, McDonald's, Hero Certified Burgers, and Nando's restaurants, as well as entertainment venues, such as Cineplex Entertainment cinemas and AMC Theatres.

In late June 2012, Coca-Cola started a limited trial in the UK (in association with Burger King UK), with the machine initially deployed in 16 locations around Greater London. They are also now in Five Guys UK branches. The selection of brands available from a UK Coke freestyle machine is different from the USA's, as only brands that are usually sold in the UK are available. Schweppes Lemonade and still versions of Fanta are brands that are available.

In late February 2015, the company updated their system to divide drinks into four different categories, including a full selection, fruit-flavored mixes, caffeine-free drinks and those with low- or zero-calorie formulations.

In March 2015, Freestyle machines were installed at Thorpe Park, Surrey, the first theme park in Europe to use Freestyle machines. This was later rolled out to further UK Merlin Entertainments theme parks in March 2020.

In 2018, Coca-Cola unveiled a new iteration of Freestyle (9100) that would begin deployment in 2019, with a 24-inch touchscreen, Bluetooth support to connect with a new, accompanying mobile app for consumers, and new hardware features intended for future capabilities and beverage options.

Products 
Customers choose a base product, which they can supplement with additional flavoring. Diet and Zero products remain low or no calories even with flavorings added. The machines include flavors not previously available to the markets served by the machines, including Orange Coke, which was previously sold only in Russia and the Baltics (and briefly in the United Kingdom and Gibraltar).  Customers may also download an app and create their own custom mixes with up to three different base products and three different flavor shots, which the fountain pours by scanning a QR code.

Flavors 

Freestyle fountains located in Firehouse Subs locations offer the chain's signature Cherry Lime-Aid. Fountains at Sea World Orlando offer an exclusive vanilla-flavored freestyle flavor called "South Pole Chill", and those located in Moe's Southwest Grill locations offer an exclusive vanilla/peach-flavored freestyle flavor called "Vanilla at Peachtree". Moes introduced a new flavor called Moe-Rita in May 2017 which "combines limeade, lemonade, orange and original flavors for a refreshing margarita-inspired sip". Machines in Wendy's restaurants have featured unique beverages such as a flavored cream soda named after founder Dave Thomas.

After Vault was discontinued in 2011, it was replaced with Mello Yello.

Dr Pepper and Diet Dr Pepper will be served instead of Pibb Xtra and Pibb Zero in areas where Dr Pepper is distributed by Coca-Cola bottlers, or at locations with separate fountain contracts to serve Dr Pepper.

Orange Vanilla Coke is a newer flavor that has been seen in new Freestyle machines. This flavor also exists in Coke Zero Sugar form.

Surge is available in Cherry, Vanilla, Grape, and Zero Sugar varieties in Freestyle machines at select Burger King restaurants.

Locations 

Currently, as in September 2020, Coca Cola freestyle is available in 16 countries on 3 continents. Asia (Singapore), Europe (Austria, Belgium, France, Germany, Ireland, Italy, Luxembourg, Netherlands, Norway, Spain, Sweden, Switzerland, UK) and North America (Canada, USA).

See also 
 Pepsi Spire

References

External links 

 
 Coca-Cola Freestyle Models
 
 

Coca-Cola
2009 introductions
Vending machines
Commercial machines
Soft drinks